The Utility Workers Union of America (UWUA) is a labor union in the United States. It has a membership of 50,000 and is affiliated with the AFL–CIO. The union has over 50,000 members working in the electric, gas, steam, water, and nuclear industries across the United States. The UWUA represents utility workers in municipal, as well as publicly traded utilities. Fields include power generation (power plants), power distribution (transmission and distribution), call/service center employees, as well as natural gas and water utilities.

References

External links
 Official website of Utility Workers Union of America
 Utility Workers Union of America, Local 1-2 Records at Tamiment Library and Robert F. Wagner Archives

AFL–CIO
Trade unions established in 1940